

The Kimberley Daily Bulletin is the local daily newspaper of Kimberley, British Columbia, Canada. The Daily Bulletin, published Mondays through Fridays, bills itself as "Canada's smallest daily newspaper".

History
Don Kendall, a former executive at Black Press, purchased the Daily Bulletin and Cranbrook Daily Townsman in July 2010, as part of a larger deal that saw Glacier Media sell several of its British Columbia papers to Black. At the time, Kendall said Black "wasn't as interested in some titles – Cranbrook, Kimberley, Nelson, and Prince Rupert – but Glacier was only selling the papers as a block."

Black did purchase the Nelson Daily News and Prince Rupert Daily News in 2010, and ended up closing them days later. It already owned competing weeklies in both Nelson and Prince Rupert.

Although it also owns a competing weekly in Cranbrook, the Kootenay Advertiser, Black purchased the Daily Townsman and Daily Bulletin from Kendall a year later, promising that both the weekly and the dailies "will continue to run under their current business plan and we anticipate few changes".

See also
Cranbrook Daily Townsman
List of newspapers in Canada

References

External links
Kimberley Daily Bulletin – Official website.

Publications established in 1932
Daily newspapers published in British Columbia
1932 establishments in British Columbia
Black Press newspapers